Lake Francis is a reservoir on the Connecticut River in northern New Hampshire, United States. The lake is located in Coos County, east of the village of Pittsburg and along the boundary between the towns of Pittsburg and Clarksville. The lake is impounded by Murphy Dam, built in 1940 as a flood control project. The  earthen dam is owned by the Water Division of the state's Department of Environmental Services, and is operated by TC Energy (formerly TransCanada Corporation).

Lake Francis and Murphy Dam are named after Francis P. Murphy, who served as the Governor of New Hampshire from 1937 to 1941.

The lake is classified as a coldwater fishery, with observed species including rainbow trout, brown trout, landlocked salmon, lake trout, and chain pickerel. There are two public boat launch locations, and ice fishing is permitted from January through March.

Lake Francis State Park is located on the northeast side of the lake, where the Connecticut River flows in. North of Lake Francis is Back Lake, while First Connecticut Lake (one of a series of four Connecticut Lakes that serve as the headwaters of the Connecticut River) lies to the northeast.

See also

List of lakes in New Hampshire

References

External links
 Lake Francis Flight (uncut) via YouTube

Lakes of Coös County, New Hampshire
Protected areas of Coös County, New Hampshire
Dams in New Hampshire
Reservoirs in New Hampshire
United States state-owned dams
Dams completed in 1940
Pittsburg, New Hampshire